I Want What I Want by Geoff Brown was first published in 1966 by Great Britain's Weidenfeld & Nicolson. It was made into a film by the same title  starring Anne Heywood.

References 

1966 British novels
Weidenfeld & Nicolson books
British LGBT novels
Novels with transgender themes
British novels adapted into films
1960s LGBT novels